The Nisqually River  is a river in west central Washington in the United States, approximately  long. It drains part of the Cascade Range southeast of Tacoma, including the southern slope of Mount Rainier, and empties into the southern end of Puget Sound. Its outlet was designated in 1971 as the Nisqually Delta National Natural Landmark.

The Nisqually River forms the Pierce–Lewis county line, as well as the boundary between Pierce and Thurston counties.

Course
The river rises in southern Mount Rainier National Park, fed by the Nisqually Glacier on the southern side of Mt. Rainier. It flows west through Ashford and Elbe along Route 706. It is then impounded for hydroelectricity by the Alder Dam, completed in 1944, and the LaGrande Dam, completed in 1912 and rebuilt in 1945. They hold back Alder Lake and the inaccessible two-mile long LaGrande Reservoir. Before the construction of the dams, a natural fish barrier prevented anadromous fish from ascending the Nisqually above what is now La Grande Reservoir.

Below Elbe, the river flows northwest through the foothills, passes near McKenna, Washington, and through Fort Lewis and the Nisqually Indian Reservation. The river crosses beneath Interstate 5 and into the Nisqually River Delta, which is the location of the Nisqually National Wildlife Refuge. The delta as a whole, including federal, state, and private land, was designated in 1971 as a National Natural Landmark.

History 
The Nisqually River is the traditional territorial center of the Nisqually tribe, for which it was named, though they also lived throughout southern Puget Sound. The Treaty of Medicine Creek, one of the major Northwest treaties between Washington territory and the native population of Puget Sound, was signed near a creek at the site of what is now a wildlife refuge near the delta of the river. The Nisqually were moved from the river and much of the surrounding region after the signing of the treaty, settling on a reservation on Puget Sound east of Olympia. After a period of resistance by the Nisqually tribe, including such leaders as Chief Leschi, a new reservation three times the size of the original was established on the river.

In 1917, the US Army occupied the Nisqually reservation, ordered people from their homes, and later condemned most of the reservation to build Fort Lewis.

In the 1960s and 1970s, the Nisqually pursued their fishing rights along the river, which were stated in the Treaty of Medicine Creek but had been ignored. Nisqually tribal members, acting in concert with the nearby Puyallup tribe, endured harassment and arrest to fish in traditional waters. This led to the 1974 Boldt Decision, also known as, U.S. V. Washington 1974, which affirmed the rights of several native tribes in Washington to harvest up to 50% of the return of salmon run within their traditional territories.

Ecology
"Nisqually-1", a specimen of Populus trichocarpa, grew on the bank of the Nisqually River. Its genome sequence was published in 2006.

Tributaries
 Van Trump Creek
 Paradise River
 Muck Creek
 Yelm Creek
 Tanwax Creek
 Ohop Creek
 Mashel River
 Little Nisqually River
 East Creek
 Mineral Creek
 Big Creek
 Kautz Creek
 Murray Creek
 Horn Creek
 Goat Creek
 Tahoma Creek
 Dead Horse Creek
 Pebble Creek

Cities and towns on the Nisqually
 Yelm
 McKenna
 Elbe
 Ashford

See also
 List of rivers in Washington

References

External links

 Nisqually River Council
 Nisqually Land Trust
 Nisqually River flooding information, Thurston County Emergency Management

Rivers of Washington (state)
Rivers of Lewis County, Washington
Rivers of Pierce County, Washington
Rivers of Thurston County, Washington
Mount Rainier